is a passenger railway station located in the city of Matsusaka,  Mie Prefecture, Japan, operated by the private railway operator Kintetsu Railway.

Lines
Ise-Nakahara Station is served by the Yamada Line, and is located 3.0 rail kilometers from the terminus of the line at Ise-Nakagawa Station.

Station layout
The station consists of two opposed side platforms connected by a level crossing. The station is unattended.

Platforms

Adjacent stations

History
On March 15, 1941, the Sangu Express Electric Railway merged with Osaka Electric Railway to become a station on Kansai Express Railway's Yamada Line, at which time the station was renamed to its present name. This line in turn was merged with the Nankai Electric Railway on June 1, 1944 to form Kintetsu. The station has been unattended since February 1, 2005.

Passenger statistics
In fiscal 2019, the station was used by an average of 233 passengers daily (boarding passengers only).

See also
List of railway stations in Japan

References

External links

 Kintetsu: Ise-Nakahara Station 

Railway stations in Japan opened in 1930
Railway stations in Mie Prefecture
Stations of Kintetsu Railway
Matsusaka, Mie